Paradorn Srichaphan was the defending champion but lost in the final 6–4, 3–6, 7–6(7–5) against Carlos Moyá.

Seeds

Draw

Finals

Top half

Bottom half

References
 2004 Chennai Open Draw

2004 Chennai Open
Singles
Maharashtra Open